Romance of Ida (Hungarian:Ida regénye) is a 1934 Hungarian drama film directed by Steve Sekely and starring Gábor Rajnay, Irén Ágay and Pál Jávor. It is based on a novel by Géza Gárdonyi.

Cast
 Gábor Rajnay - Ó Péter 
 Irén Ágay - Ó Ida 
 Pál Jávor - Balogh János 
 Ella Gombaszögi - Julis 
 Gyula Gózon - Bogár úr 
 Erzsi Paál - Ella 
 Lili Berky - Fõnökasszony 
 Sándor Pethes - Dr. Csorba 
 Kató Eöry - Jolán 
 Ida Turay - Fazekas 
 Éva Fenyvessy - Szobalány 
 Blanka Szombathelyi - Timár 
 Annie Réthy - Mészkuthy 
 Piri Peéry - Otilia nõr 
 Margit Ladomerszky - Ladiszla nõr 
 Gerő Mály - Tejesember 
 Zoltán Makláry - Sofõr 
 Győző Zákányi - Máté 
 László Dezsõffy - Színiigazgató 
 Erzsi Pártos - Drámai szende 
 Böske T. Oláh - Sziniigazgató felesége 
 Lajos Ihász - Hõszerelmes 
 Andor Sárossy - Bucher 
 Ernő Király - Fõpincér

External links

1934 films
Hungarian drama films
1930s Hungarian-language films
Films directed by Steve Sekely
Films based on Hungarian novels
Hungarian black-and-white films
1934 drama films